A stocking frame was a mechanical knitting machine used in the textiles industry. It was invented by William Lee of Calverton near Nottingham in 1589. Its use, known traditionally as framework knitting,  was the first major stage in the mechanisation of the textile industry, and played an important part in the early history of the Industrial Revolution. It was adapted to knit cotton and to do ribbing, and by 1800 had been adapted as a lace making machine.

Description

Lee's machine consisted of a stout wooden frame. It did straight knitting, not tubular knitting. It had a separate needle for each loop - these were low carbon steel bearded needles where the tips were reflexed and could be depressed onto a hollow, closing the loop. The needles were supported on a needle bar that passed back and forth, to and from the operator. The beards were simultaneously depressed by a presser bar. The first machine had eight needles per inch and was suitable for worsted. The next version had 16 needles per inch and was suitable for silk.

The mechanical movements:
The needle bar goes forward; the open needles clear the web.
The weft thread is laid on the needles; the jack sinkers descend and form loops.
The weft thread is pushed down by the divider bar.
The jack sinkers come forward pulling the thread into the beard of the open needles.
The presser bar drops, the needle loops close and the old row of stitches is drawn off the needle.
The jack sinkers come down in front of the knitting and pull it up so the process can begin again.

History

The machine imitated the movements of hand knitters. Lee demonstrated the operation of the device to Queen Elizabeth I, hoping to obtain a patent, but she refused, fearing the effects on hand-knitting industries. The original frame had eight needles to the inch, which produced only coarse fabric. Lee later improved the mechanism with 20 needles to the inch. By 1598 he was able to knit stockings from silk, as well as wool, but was again refused a patent by James I. Lee moved to France, under the patronage of Henri IV, with his workers and his machines, but was unable to sustain his business. He died in Paris around 1614. Most of his workers returned to England with their frames, which were sold in London.

The commercial failure of Lee's design might have led to a dead-end for the knitting machine, but John Ashton, one of Lee's assistants, made a crucial improvement by adding the mechanism known as a "divider". This is used after the jack sinkers have pulled down a large loop over all the needles, and the sinker bar has separated out the loop, the dividers are rested on the loop to give the bearded needles guidance as they are pulled forward.

Development
A thriving business built up with the exiled Huguenot silk-spinners who had settled in the village of Spitalfields just outside the city of London. In 1663, the Worshipful Company of Framework Knitters was issued a royal charter. By about 1785, however, demand was rising for cheaper stockings made of cotton. The frame was adapted but became too expensive for individuals to buy; thus, wealthy men bought the machines and hired them out to the knitters, providing the materials and buying the finished product. With increasing competition, they ignored the standards set by the Chartered Company. Frames were introduced to Leicester by Nicholas Alsop in around 1680, who encountered resistance and at first worked secretly in a cellar in Northgate Street, taking his own sons and the children of near relatives as apprentices. In 1728, the Nottingham magistrates refused to accept the authority of the London Company, and the centre of the trade moved northwards to Nottingham, which also had a lace making industry.

The breakthrough with cotton stockings came in 1758 when Jedediah Strutt introduced an attachment for the frame which produced what became known as the "Derby rib". The Nottingham frameworkers found themselves increasingly short of raw materials. Initially they used thread spun in India, but this was expensive and required doubling. Lancashire yarn was spun for fustian and varied in texture. They tried spinning cotton themselves but, being used to the long fibres of wool, experienced great difficulty.  Meanwhile, the Gloucester spinners, who had been used to a much shorter wool, were able to handle cotton and their frameworkers were competing with the Nottingham producers.

Influence on the Industrial Revolution
It was then that Richard Arkwright arrived with his new experimental spinning machinery. He initially built a works operated by horsepower but it was evident that six to eight would be needed at a time, changed every half-hour. He moved to Cromford and set up what became known as the water frame. Strutt, as his partner, set up mills at Belper and Milford. Thus the area joined Nottingham in producing cotton stockings, while Derby, with its mills originated by John Lombe continued largely with silk; Leicester, a farming area, continued with wool.

For mechanical power to be applied to a stocking frame, it had to be adapted for rotary motion. In 1769, Samuel Wise, a clockmaker, took out a patent for changing the hand frame into a rotary. In Nottingham's case, steam coal was easily available from the Nottinghamshire coalfield.

By 1812, there were estimated to be over 25,000 frames in use, most of them in the three counties, and the frame had come back to Calverton.

Derby Rib machine
The Derby Rib machine was invented in 1757 by Strutt. It consisted of an extra set of bearded needles that operated vertically, taking the loop and reversing them. This allowed a plain and purl knit to be used, and led to ribbing and a tighter more flexible fabric. To do a 3:1 rib, there would be one vertical needle after every third horizontal needle.

Lace making
Lacey knits can be achieved by slipping a stitch, picking up a stitch or knitting two together. On a frame, a tickler wire could realise individual loops and create a run that would be picked up by hand. The frame was modified by adding a tickler bar and a tuck presser, to allow held and tuck stitches. Here the weft was held in the beard and carried up to the next course where two threads were passed together. Messrs Morris and Betts took a patent (807) in 1764 on a stitch transfer device where threads from one needle were passed to another. With tuck stitches, this created 'eyelet holes'. Partial stitch transfer produced a marker stitch.

In 1764, a profound change was made to the stocking frame that enabled it to produce weft-knitted nets. Hammond, the attributed inventor, used ticklers to stitch-transfer from one needle to the third one along crossing over two intermediate needles creating a cross stitch. He also used a tickler to move two stitches two to the right, and then two to the left in a double cross stitch, Valenciennes lace. To do this the tickler bar was detached from the frame and attached to 'dogs', that is, jointed arms. This allowed forward motion to scoop, and sideways motion to shog. New inventions were patented: Frost's tickler net of 1769, the two plain net of 1777 and the square net of 1781, and their patents were fiercely defended. Harvey changed the shape of the tickler wires to avoid one in his pin machine. This became popular in Lyon and Paris where 2000 frames were in use in 1800.

In 1803 cotton was used with silk, as Houldsworths were producing 300 count cotton.

Postscript
A legend later developed that Lee had invented the first machine in order to get revenge on a lover who had preferred to concentrate on her knitting rather than attend to him. A painting illustrating this story was once displayed in the Stocking Framer's Guild hall in London. In 1846 the Victorian artist Alfred Elmore produced a variation on the story in his popular painting The Invention of the Stocking Loom, in which Lee is depicted pondering his idea as he watches his wife knitting (Nottingham Castle Museum).

See also 
 Luddism
 Protection of Stocking Frames, etc. Act 1788
 Destruction of Stocking Frames, etc. Act 1812
 Water frame
 Bobbinet
 Worshipful Company of Framework Knitters where it appears in their coat of arms

References

Notes

Bibliography
 
 Cooper, B., (1983) Transformation of a Valley: The Derbyshire Derwent, Heinneman, republished 1991 Cromford: Scarthin Books

External links

 Leicestershire Industrial History Society explanatory video featuring Martin Green
  Ruddington Framework Knitters' Museum
 William Lee - The Triumphs and Trials of an Elizabethan Inventor
 
 Wigston Framework Knitters Museum, Leicestershire
 Historic Highlights in Development of Hosiery-Knitting by Mildred Barnwell Andrews

Knitting tools and materials
Industrial Revolution
Textile machinery
English inventions
Lace-making machinery